The Dungeon Family is a musical collective, based in Atlanta, Georgia that specializes in Southern hip hop with heavy funk and soul influences. The group derives its name from "The Dungeon", the name given to record producer Rico Wade's studio, located in the basement of his mother's house, where many of the early members of the collective did their first recordings. Rico Wade, Ray Murray, and Sleepy Brown constitute the production/songwriting team Organized Noize, who have produced hits for the main popular Dungeon Family groups Outkast and Goodie Mob.

The collective released their first album together, titled Even in Darkness, on November 26, 2001.

Label dissolution
On October 7, 2011, it was announced that Arista, along with Jive and J Records, would be shut down. All artists on those labels, including The Dungeon Family, were moved to RCA Records.

In visual media
On February 8, 2016, it was announced that on March 22, 2016, the documentary The Art of Organized Noize would premier on Netflix.

Members

1st generation
 Organized Noize
 Rico Wade
 Sleepy Brown
 Ray Murray
Outkast
 André 3000
 Big Boi
 Earthtone III
 André 3000
 Big Boi
 Mr. DJ
 Goodie Mob
 Big Gipp
 T-Mo
 CeeLo Green
 Khujo
 Parental Advisory
 Mello
 K.P.
 Big Reese
 Lumberjacks
 T-Mo
 Khujo
 Society of Soul
 Sleepy Brown
 Roni
 Big Rube
 Ray Murray
 Rico Wade
 Sleepy's Theme
 Sleepy Brown
 Eddie Stokes
 Victor Alexander
 Joi
 Witchdoctor
 Cool Breeze
 Backbone
 Debra Killings

2nd generation
 Killer Mike
 Slimm Calhoun
 The Calhouns
 Slimm Cutta Calhoun
 Lucky Calhoun
 Pauly Calhoun
 Konkrete
 BlackOwned C-Bone
 Lil' Brotha
 Supa Nate
 Purple Ribbon All-Stars
 Big Boi 
 Killer Mike
 Konkrete
 Vonnegutt 
 TJG
 Janelle Monáe
 Scar
 Bubba Sparxxx
 Sniper Unit
 Big L (Pauly Calhoun)
 Swift C (Lucky Calhoun)
 Da Connect
 Meathead (Future)
 Infinique
 Boulevard Intl.
 G-Rock
 C-Smooth
 Rico Wade
 ChamDon
 G-Rock
 C-Smooth

Discography
 Even in Darkness (2001)

References

 
Alternative hip hop groups
Hip hop collectives
Musical groups established in 1992
Hip hop supergroups
Southern hip hop groups
Musical groups from Atlanta